Early general elections were held in Liechtenstein on 24 October 1993 following the dissolution of Parliament on 15 September after a vote of no confidence in Prime Minister Markus Büchel initiated by members of his own party, the Progressive Citizens' Party. The result was a victory for the Patriotic Union, which won 13 of the 25 seats in the Landtag. Voter turnout was 85.31%.

Results

References

Liechtenstein
1993 in Liechtenstein
1993 10
October 1993 events in Europe